Kofi Karikari (–) was the tenth King of the Ashanti Empire, and grandnephew of Kwaku Dua I, whose sudden death in April 1867 sparked internal strife about the succession. Kofi Karikari was chosen by electoral majority, reigning from 28 May 1867 until his forced abdication on 26 October 1874. Karikari was the son of Afua Kobi.

A notable achievement of Karikari was the intentional neglect of the armed forces, a step taken to avoid the escalation of war. A golden trophy head, owned by Karikari, was among many items "pillaged from the royal mausoleum in Kumasi by a British 'expedition' in the 1880s, can be found at the Wallace Collection in London".

References 

1830s births
1880s deaths
19th-century monarchs in Africa
Ashanti monarchs
Date of birth unknown
Date of death unknown
People from Kumasi